Youssouf Togoïmi (26 March 1953 – 24 September 2002) was a Chadian politician who served in the government under President Idriss Déby but subsequently led a rebel group, the Movement for Democracy and Justice in Chad (MDJT), against Déby.

Life and career
Born in Zouar in the Tibesti Mountains, he came from the northern Muslim population of the country. Togoïmi served as in a number of positions during the presidency of Idriss Déby: he was Minister of Justice from 1990 to 1993, Minister of Defence from 1995 to 1997, and was then appointed Minister of the Interior on 21 May 1997. Shortly after the latter appointment, he resigned from the government on 3 June 1997. He said that his resignation came about because of what he described as the "dictatorial drift" of the government. Togoïmi's break with Déby has also been interpreted in ethnic terms, based on his own status as a Toubou and Déby's status as a Zaghawa.

On 12 October 1998, he formed the Movement for Democracy and Justice in Chad (MDJT), a dissident rebel group that sought to overthrow the government, initially with the support of Libya. Operating initially from his power base in the Tibesti Mountains, the group waged a guerilla war against government forces. He was re-elected as party leader at a party congress in Sabha, Libya in December 2001 and on 25 December he expressed a willingness to negotiate with the government. The MDJT's second vice-president Adoum Togoi signed a peace agreement with the government in Tripoli, Libya, on 7 January 2002. This terms of the agreement involved, among other things, a cease-fire, inclusion of the MDJT in the government, and integration of its fighters into the army. An amnesty for MDJT members was approved by the National Assembly of Chad in late February. A month later, the agreement began to break down as the government rejected MDJT demands, including its proposal for new prime minister from the MDJT. In May, Togoi, who was viewed as a moderate in the group, was allegedly ambushed, injured and kidnapped by Togoïmi, who was viewed as a hard-liner, an apparent result of a split in the group regarding how to handle the peace negotiations, and late in the month the first fighting since the signing of the peace agreement broke out.

Togoïmi was injured by a land mine in late August in the Tibesti area and he died from his wounds in Tripoli on 24 September 2002. Mockhtar Wawa Dahab, a spokesman for the Chadian government, responded to the death by stating that it "ought to make it easier for peace to return to Chad".

References

External links
 US State Department report on Chad
 European Rim Policy and Investment Council report of MDJC rebellion

1953 births
2002 deaths
Chadian rebels
Government ministers of Chad
People from Tibesti Region